Carlepont is a commune in the Oise department in northern France.

See also
Communes of the Oise department
Monument aux morts (Oise)

References

Communes of Oise